The ISU Junior Grand Prix in Poland is an international figure skating competition. Sanctioned by the International Skating Union, it is held in the autumn in some years as part of the JGP series. Medals may be awarded in the disciplines of men's singles, ladies' singles, pair skating, and ice dancing.  When held in Gdańsk, the qualifying event is usually known as the Baltic Cup. It may be titled the Toruń Cup or Copernicus Stars when held in Toruń.

Junior medalists

Men

Ladies

Pairs

Ice dancing

References

External links 
 ISU Junior Grand Prix at the International Skating Union
 Polish Figure Skating Association 

Poland
Junior Grand Prix